The Dukat mine is one of the largest gold mines in Russia and in the world. The mine is located few km west of Dukat, a town in Omsukchansky District, Magadan Oblast. The mine has estimated reserves of 7.4 million oz of gold.

See also
Gold mining

References

Gold mines in Russia
Geography of Magadan Oblast